The Patagonian Batholith is a collective name for a three batholiths in western and southern Patagonia: 
North Patagonian Batholith
South Patagonian Batholith
Tierra del Fuego Batholith